A number of presidential offices have existed in Germany since the collapse of the German Empire in 1918.

The Weimar Constitution of August 1919 created the office of President of Germany. Upon the death of Paul von Hindenburg in August 1934, the office was left vacant, with Adolf Hitler becoming head of state as Führer und Reichskanzler (retroactively approved by a referendum). In April–May 1945, Karl Dönitz briefly became President upon the suicide of Hitler (in accordance with the last will and testament of Hitler).

The Basic Law for the Federal Republic of Germany of May 1949 created the office of President of the Federal Republic of Germany. Since German reunification in 1990, the President has been the head of state for all of Germany.

The East German constitution of October 1949 created the office of President of the German Democratic Republic (DDR). Upon the death of Wilhelm Pieck in 1960, the office of president was replaced by a collective head of state, the Staatsrat ("State Council"). After the Staatsrat was abolished on 5 April 1990, the president of the Volkskammer ("People's Chamber") served as head of state until East Germany joined the Federal Republic on 3 October 1990

German Reich (1871–1945)

Weimar Republic (1919–1933) 
† denotes people who died in office.

Nazi Germany (1933–1945) 
† denotes people who died in office.

German Democratic Republic (East Germany) (1949–1990)
† denotes people who died in office.

|-align="center"
! colspan=7| President of the Republic

|-align="center"
! colspan=7| Chairman of the State Council

|-align="center"
! colspan=7| President of the People's Chamber

Federal Republic of Germany (1949–present)
† denotes people who died in office.

See also

List of German monarchs
President of Germany
President of Germany (1919–1945)
Leadership of East Germany
President of East Germany
Chancellor of Germany
List of chancellors of Germany

Notes

 
Germany
Presidents